Walter Hofmann (born 26 September 1949 in Sömmerda) is a former East German slalom canoeist who competed in the 1970s. He won a gold medal in the C-2 event at the 1972 Summer Olympics in Munich.

Hofmann also won four medals at the ICF Canoe Slalom World Championships with three golds (C-2: 1977; C-2 team: 1971, 1975) and a silver (C-2: 1971).

References

1949 births
Canoeists at the 1972 Summer Olympics
German male canoeists
Living people
Olympic canoeists of East Germany
Olympic gold medalists for East Germany
Olympic medalists in canoeing
Medalists at the 1972 Summer Olympics
Medalists at the ICF Canoe Slalom World Championships